Christina Scull (born 6 March 1942 in Bristol, England) is a British researcher and writer best known for her books about the works of J. R. R. Tolkien.

Biography 

Christina Scull was born in Bristol and was educated at the Redmaids' High School there. She worked for the London Board of Trade from 1961 to 1971 while completing her Bachelor of Arts degree in art history and medieval history at Birkbeck College. From 1971 to 1995 she served as Librarian of the Sir John Soane's Museum in London. John Garth describes Scull and Hammond as "two highly regarded veterans of Tolkien studies." She married Wayne G. Hammond in December 1994 and has subsequently collaborated with him on several projects.

J. R. R. Tolkien: Artist and Illustrator: won the 1996 Mythopoeic Scholarship Award for Inklings Studies, one of four such awards that Scull has won.

Books 

 1991 The Soane Hogarths. Sir John Soane's Museum and Trefoil Publications.
 1995 (with Wayne G. Hammond) J. R. R. Tolkien: Artist and Illustrator. Houghton Mifflin.
 2005 (with Wayne G. Hammond) The Lord of the Rings: A Reader's Companion. Houghton Mifflin.
 2006 (with Wayne G. Hammond) The Lord of the Rings 1954-2004: Scholarship in Honor of Richard E. Blackwelder. Marquette University Press.
 2006 (with Wayne G. Hammond) The J. R. R. Tolkien Companion and Guide. Houghton Mifflin. Revised and expanded edition 2017.
 2018 (with Catherine McIlwaine) Tolkien: Maker of Middle-earth. Bodleian Library.

See also

 Tolkien research
 Middle-earth

References

External links
Official site of Christina Scull and Wayne Hammond
 
 

Alumni of Birkbeck, University of London
Living people
1942 births
Writers from Bristol
Tolkien Society members
Tolkien studies